Henniker is a town in Merrimack County, New Hampshire, United States. As of the 2020 census, the reported total population of the town was 6,185, although the figure, 27.9% greater than the 2010 population, has been questioned by local officials. Henniker is home to New England College and Pats Peak Ski Area. Henniker is a college town and resort area, featuring both skiing and white-water kayaking.

The main village of the town, where 3,166 people resided at the 2020 census, is defined as the Henniker census-designated place (CDP), and is located along the Contoocook River at the junction of New Hampshire Route 114 with Old Concord Road. The town also includes the village of West Henniker.

History

The area was first known as "Number Six" in a line of settlements running between the Merrimack and Connecticut rivers. In 1752, the Masonian Proprietors granted the land to Andrew Todd, who called it "Todd's Town". Settled in 1761 by James Peter, it was dubbed "New Marlborough" by others from Marlboro, Massachusetts. Incorporated in 1768 by Governor John Wentworth, the town was named for Sir John Henniker, a London merchant of leather and fur, with shipping interests in Boston and Portsmouth.

In the 19th century Henniker had a high rate of congenital deafness, and its own sign language, which may have played a significant role in the emergence of American Sign Language.

Farmers found the town's surface relatively even, with fertile soil. Various mills operated by water power on the Contoocook River, including a woolen factory. By 1859, the population was 1,688. But the mills in Henniker were closed in 1959 by the Hopkinton-Everett Lakes Flood Control Project.

The Edna Dean Proctor Bridge, a stone double-arch bridge spanning the Contoocook, was built in 1835. A building for Henniker Academy was constructed of split granite in 1836.

Beginning in the late 1800s, the river's scenic beauty attracted tourism.

The game of paintball originated in Henniker in 1981.

Geography
Henniker is drained by the Contoocook River and its tributary Amey Brook. The town's southwest corner is drained by headwaters of Dudley Brook, leading to the Piscataquog River in neighboring Weare. The town lies fully within the Merrimack River watershed.

Henniker is crossed by U.S. Route 202 and state routes 9 and 114.

Adjacent municipalities 
 Warner (north)
 Hopkinton (east)
 Weare (southeast)
 Deering (southwest)
 Hillsborough (west)
 Bradford (northwest)

Demographics

As of the census of 2010, there were 4,836 people, 1,780 households, and 1,124 families residing in the town. There were 1,928 housing units, of which 148, or 7.7%, were vacant. The racial makeup of the town was 95.7% white, 1.2% African American, 0.4% Native American, 1.1% Asian, 0.0% Native Hawaiian or Pacific Islander, 0.5% some other race, and 1.1% from two or more races. 1.7% of the population were Hispanic or Latino of any race.

Of the 1,780 households, 30.3% had children under the age of 18 living with them, 49.2% were headed by married couples living together, 9.5% had a female householder with no husband present, and 36.9% were non-families. 26.3% of all households were made up of individuals, and 7.1% were someone living alone who was 65 years of age or older. The average household size was 2.41, and the average family size was 2.91. 541 residents, or 11.3% of the population, lived in group quarters rather than households.

In the town, 19.1% of the population were under the age of 18, 21.3% were from 18 to 24, 20.1% from 25 to 44, 30.5% from 45 to 64, and 9.0% were 65 years of age or older. The median age was 35.2 years. For every 100 females, there were 102.0 males. For every 100 females age 18 and over, there were 99.5 males.

For the period 2011–2015, the estimated median annual income for a household was $67,197, and the median income for a family was $80,845. Male full-time workers had a median income of $67,755 versus $49,677 for females. The per capita income for the town was $28,377. 10.3% of the population and 3.3% of families were below the poverty line. 12.8% of the population under the age of 18 and 5.5% of those 65 or older were living in poverty.

Government
In the New Hampshire Senate, Henniker is in the 15th District, represented by Democrat Dan Feltes. On the New Hampshire Executive Council, Henniker is in the 2nd District, represented by Democrat Andru Volinsky. In the United States House of Representatives, Henniker is in New Hampshire's 2nd congressional district, represented by Democrat Ann McLane Kuster.

Education
Henniker is part of New Hampshire School Administrative Unit #24, which also includes Weare and Stoddard, New Hampshire. Kindergarten and primary school students attend Henniker Community School, while secondary level students attend John Stark Regional High School in Weare. Henniker is also home to New England College, a four-year private liberal arts college. Henniker has a free library for residents, two community centers, and a Parent-Teacher Association.

Culture

Religion
Henniker has a Congregational church, a Roman Catholic church, a Quaker meeting house, and Community Christian Fellowship.

Notable people 

 Amy Beach (1867–1944), composer, pianist
 Laurie D. Cox (1883–1968), landscape architect, lacrosse coach, college president
 Robert Goodenow (1800–1874), US congressman
 Rufus K. Goodenow (1790–1863), US congressman
 Ocean Born Mary (1720–1814), subject of a local ghost legend
 James W. Patterson (1823–1893), US congressman, senator
 Parker Pillsbury (1809–1898), minister; abolitionist
 Edna Dean Proctor (1829–1923), writer
 Jacob Rice (1787–1879), state legislator, farmer
 Kristen Ulmer (born 1966), extreme skier, writer
 Ted Williams (1918–2002), left fielder with the Boston Red Sox and manager of the Washington Senators/Texas Rangers

Sites of interest
Ames State Forest
Craney Hill State Forest
Henniker Historical Society at Henniker Academy
New England College
Pats Peak

References

External links

 
 Tucker Free Library
 Henniker Historical Society
 New England College
 New Hampshire Economic and Labor Market Information Bureau Profile

 
Towns in Merrimack County, New Hampshire
Populated places established in 1768
1768 establishments in New Hampshire
Towns in New Hampshire